North Central Pennsylvania, parts of which are sometimes referred to as the Northern Tier, is a region in the U.S. state of Pennsylvania which consists of sixteen counties.

History
The region is believed to have been settled by Europeans in 1759 but was not officially recorded until 1761. Most of the colonists were of Dutch, English, German or Scandinavian ancestry. Prior to these settlers this area was under the control of multiple Native American tribes.

This region is one of the state's most rich in terms of historical significance, popular culture and population diversity. Much of this area is in the Susquehanna Valley which contains the Susquehanna River which flows through New York, Pennsylvania, and Maryland. The northernmost part of this region is bordered to the north by the Southern Tier of New York state. Together, these regions are known as the Twin Tiers. The five Northern Tier counties are home to roughly 180,000 people distributed among many small towns and the countryside. The more southern areas, such as Lycoming, Clinton, Centre and Northumberland Counties, are where most of the region's population lives.

Description

North Central Pennsylvania has an abundance of flora and fauna, in addition to its cultural diversity. The region is mostly mountainous as it is located in the northern part of the Appalachian Mountain range. There are few large cities in North Central Pennsylvania, most of its population live in smaller boroughs or townships (populations between 5,000-15,000) than in large cities.

This region is also the state and national leader in the production of natural gas as it sits on a large gas deposit, part of the Marcellus Shale.

Counties and cities

Counties

North Central Pennsylvania consists of 12 counties.

In alphabetical order those counties are:

 Bradford
 Centre
 Clinton
 Columbia
 Lycoming
 Montour
 Northumberland
 Potter
 Sullivan
 Snyder
 Tioga
 Union

Cities
Largest cities based on population (Top 5):

Education 
There are a total of 89 public school districts in this area, in which are 102 high schools, 147 middle schools and 307 elementary schools.

Universities 
 Bloomsburg University of Pennsylvania
 Bucknell University
 Lock Haven University of Pennsylvania
 Lycoming College
 Mansfield University of Pennsylvania
 Pennsylvania College of Technology
 Pennsylvania State University
Private universities in italics

Sport
North Central Pennsylvania has no major sports franchises. However, Pennsylvania State University is located in Centre County. As part of the Big Ten Conference the University has a massive athletic grasp on this region, in terms of sporting events and camps.

Non-major professional sports
 Williamsport Crosscutters Single-A affiliate of the Philadelphia Phillies
 State College Spikes Single-A affiliate of the St. Louis Cardinals

Little League World Series
In August every summer, South Williamsport holds the Little League World Series. About one hundred players and their family members from around the country and world come to compete and spectate. The city welcomes thousands of visitors during this period of time. The games are aired on ESPN worldwide.

References 

Regions of Pennsylvania